Ypthima tabella is a species of Satyrinae butterfly found in South India, described by Marshall and De Nicéville in 1883. Some experts still consider this as a subspecies of Ypthima philomela, baby fivering.

Description
The upper side of male is brown, uniform in color. Fore-wing has a bipupilled ocellus. Hind-wing has two submarginal ocelli between the median nervules. Underside is pale brown.  Fore-wing has one ocellus. Hind-wing has six ocelli, placed in pairs. No sexual patch on fore-wing on upper-side.

It can be distinguished from Ypthima philomela by the absence of sexual mark in the male.

References

External links

Ypthima
Butterflies described in 1883
Taxa named by Lionel de Nicéville